FOB Wishtan is an International Security Assistance Force (ISAF) Forward Operating Base (FOB) operated by the British Army and located in Sangin District, Helmand Province, Afghanistan.

History
FOB Wishtan was built by Echo Company, 2nd Battalion 7th Marines, United States Marine Corps (USMC) during 2008 and was handed to the British Army during October 2008 with the first unit being Whiskey Company, 45 Commando, Royal Marines.

The following units were posted here at some point:
 Operation Enduring Freedom - Afghanistan (OEF-A)
 Echo Company, 2nd Battalion 7th Marines, USMC until October 2008
 Operation Herrick IX (October 2008 - April 2009)
 Whiskey Company, 45 Commando, Royal Marines
 Operation Herrick X (April – October 2009)
 A Company, 2nd Battalion, The Rifles until June 2009
 C Company, 2nd Battalion, The Rifles from July 2009
 Operation Herrick XI (October 2009 - April 2010)
 B Company, 1st Battalion, The Royal Regiment of Scotland
 Operation Herrick XII (April - October 2010)
 A Company, 1st Battalion, The Mercian Regiment (Cheshire)

Current use
It was abandoned in 2010.

See also
List of ISAF installations in Afghanistan

References

Military bases of the United Kingdom in Afghanistan